The Ragamuffin Gospel is a book about the essence of Christianity by former Franciscan priest Brennan Manning.  Manning argues that Jesus' gospel was one of grace, and that efforts to earn salvation are impossibly misguided.  He states that the true meaning of God's grace has been lost in society amidst a constant search to merely please God, as though the Almighty is only a "small minded book keeper," who tallies sins and uses them against humanity. Citing numerous biblical references and utilizing colleagues' stories, Manning illustrates the simple need for humanity to accept the freedom of God's grace, and its power to change lives.  A popular quote from the book: “To evangelize a person is to say to him or her: you, too, are loved by God in the Lord Jesus.” It was first published in 1990.

The book title was the inspiration for Christian musical artist Rich Mullins' band name A Ragamuffin Band. It also inspired TobyMac to write "Speak Life".

References

External links 
The 50 Best Quotes From The Ragamuffin Gospel

1990 non-fiction books